The Western Division was one of four divisions that previously made up the Arena Football League. The Western Division was formed in 1992 when the AFL first split into three divisions. The League used only conferences in 1993 and 1994, but returned to division play in 1995. Because the number of active AFL teams has decreased greatly in recent years, the league no longer uses divisions.

Division lineups
1992
Arizona Rattlers
Dallas Texans
Sacramento Attack
San Antonio Force
Creation of the Western Division. Arizona, Sacramento, and San Antonio are enfranchised. San Antonio folded in 1993 as the AFL realigned into the American/National conference format, suspending the Western Division (for two years) as well. Also in the 1993 season, Sacramento Attack joined the National Conference as they move to Miami, Florida as the Hooters.

1995
Arizona Rattlers
Las Vegas Sting
San Jose SaberCats
The Western Division returned as an American Conference division. San Jose SaberCats enfranchised.

1996
Anaheim Piranhas
Arizona Rattlers
Minnesota Fighting Pike
San Jose SaberCats
Las Vegas moved to Anaheim as the Piranhas. Minnesota Fighting Pike enfranchised.

1997
Anaheim Piranhas
Arizona Rattlers
San Jose SaberCats
Minnesota folded.

1998–1999
Arizona Rattlers
Portland Forest Dragons
San Jose SaberCats
Anaheim folded. Portland moved in from the American Conference's Central Division.

2000
Arizona Rattlers
Los Angeles Avengers
Oklahoma Wranglers
San Jose SaberCats
Los Angeles Avengers enfranchised. Portland moved to Oklahoma City as Oklahoma Wranglers.

2001
Arizona Rattlers
Houston Thunderbears
Los Angeles Avengers
Oklahoma Wranglers
San Jose SaberCats
Houston moved in from the Central Division.

2002
Arizona Rattlers
Dallas Desperados
Los Angeles Avengers
San Jose SaberCats
Dallas Desperados enfranchised. Houston and Oklahoma folded.

2003
Arizona Rattlers
Colorado Crush
Los Angeles Avengers
San Jose SaberCats
Colorado Crush enfranchised. Dallas moved to Central Division

2004–2005
Arizona Rattlers
Las Vegas Gladiators
Los Angeles Avengers
San Jose SaberCats
Colorado moved to Central Division. Las Vegas moved in from National Conference's Eastern Division.

2006–2007
Arizona Rattlers
Las Vegas Gladiators
Los Angeles Avengers
San Jose SaberCats
Utah Blaze
Utah Blaze enfranchised.

2008
Arizona Rattlers
Los Angeles Avengers
San Jose SaberCats
Utah Blaze
Las Vegas moved to Cleveland, rejoining the Eastern Division. In 2009, the AFL was put on a one-year hiatus as Los Angeles Avengers folded, San Jose suspended, and Utah played for the AIFA's 2009 season.

2010
Arizona Rattlers
Spokane Shock
Utah Blaze
The Western Division moved to the National Conference. Spokane moved in from the now-defunct AF2. Utah moved back from AIFA.

2011–2013
Arizona Rattlers
San Jose SaberCats
Spokane Shock
Utah Blaze
San Jose returned.

2014
Arizona Rattlers
Los Angeles Kiss
San Antonio Talons
Los Angeles Kiss enfranchised, Utah folded, San Jose and Spokane moved to the Pacific Division.

2015
Arizona Rattlers
Los Angeles Kiss
Las Vegas Outlaws
Las Vegas Outlaws enfranchised, San Antonio went dormant.

Divisions were discontinued after the 2015 season.

Division Champions

Wild Card qualifiers

References 

Arena Football League divisions
Arizona Rattlers
Los Angeles Kiss
San Antonio Talons
San Jose SaberCats
Spokane Shock
Sports in the Western United States
1992 establishments in the United States
San Antonio Force
Dallas Texans (Arena)
Florida Bobcats
Minnesota Fighting Pike
Anaheim Piranhas
Los Angeles Avengers
Oklahoma Wranglers
Dallas Desperados
Colorado Crush
Las Vegas Outlaws (arena football)
Las Vegas Gladiators